Charles Edward Quaid (17 August 1908 – 18 December 1984) was a New Zealand rugby union player. He was a member of the New Zealand national side, the All Blacks, on their 1938 tour of Australia on which he played four matches, including two internationals.

Quaid died at Upper Hutt on 18 December 1984, and was buried at Akatarawa Cemetery.

References

1908 births
1984 deaths
Rugby union players from Christchurch
New Zealand rugby union players
New Zealand international rugby union players
Canterbury rugby union players
Wellington rugby union players
Otago rugby union players
Rugby union hookers
Burials at Akatarawa Cemetery